"Two Hearts / Wild Soul (Changmin from 東方神起)" is Tohoshinki's 17th Japanese single, released on February 6, 2008. The single is the first installment of the song "TRICK" in the album T.

Track list

Release history

Charts

Oricon Sales Chart (Japan)

Korea Top 20 foreign albums & singles

References

External links
 https://web.archive.org/web/20050428085252/http://toho-jp.net/index.html

2008 singles
TVXQ songs
2008 songs
Rhythm Zone singles